Alliance for the Future (APB) is a political party in the Czech Republic, established in 2016 as the Civic Democratic Alliance (ODA). It considers itself to be successor of the previous Civic Democratic Alliance. It was established in September 2016 by current leader Pavel Sehnal, and former Prime Minister Petr Nečas is also involved with the party. The party participated in the 2017 legislative election and plans to participate in the 2018 municipal election. The leaders of the original Civic Democratic Alliance are not involved with the party.

Ideology
ODA is a conservative-liberal centre-right party. It supports the European Union and multiculturalism.

History
The party was founded in December 2016 by Pavel Sehnal, CEO of SPGroup. The company is closely linked with the party and leading associates of the company became key members of the party. Sehnal said that the party is a successor to the original Civic Democratic Alliance.

On 29 June 2017, ODA announced Vratislav Kulhánek as its presidential candidate for the 2018 presidential election, and started gathering signatures.

On 17 July 2017, ODA announced that it would participate in the 2017 legislative election, co-operating with a political movement For Health and Sport.

In August 2017, ODA started working with a controversial youtuber, Mikael Oganesjan, and controversial agency Plavec Media. This was criticised in the media. The negative response on social media caused Sehnal to end the collaboration.

Composition

Election results

Chamber of Deputies

Presidential

References

External links
Civic Democratic Alliance official site

Liberal parties in the Czech Republic
Pro-European political parties in the Czech Republic
Conservative liberal parties
Right-wing parties in the Czech Republic
Civic Democratic Alliance
2016 establishments in the Czech Republic
Political parties established in 2016